Clube Desportivo Santa Clara is a Portuguese football club from Ponta Delgada, Azores. They play in the 13,277-seat Estádio de São Miguel. They are the most successful football team from the Azores Islands as the only team from the archipelago to compete in a UEFA competition, having qualified for the UEFA Intertoto Cup and the UEFA Europa Conference League.

To date, Santa Clara is the only club from the Azores islands to have competed in the top division of the Portuguese Liga, being thus the westernmost top-flight club in Europe. They compete in the Primeira Liga, the Portuguese first division football league.  Santa Clara's kit manufacturer is Kelme and their main sponsor is Santander. Main rivals are CD Operário from Lagoa. Other major rivals are C.S. Marítimo and C.D. Nacional, from the island of Madeira.

History
Santa Clara reached the Primeira Liga for the first time by coming third in the 1998–99 Liga de Honra, but were instantly relegated back in last place. The team bounced back by winning the 2000–01 Segunda Liga under Manuel Fernandes and later Carlos Manuel. Fernandes, who left for Sporting CP in January 2001, returned in October.

Despite coming 14th in their first top-flight season, Santa Clara were chosen by UEFA to play in the 2002 UEFA Intertoto Cup when Vitória S.C. withdrew, needing the summer to renovate their Estádio D. Afonso Henriques for UEFA Euro 2004. They beat Armenia's Shirak FC 5–3 on aggregate in the first round before falling 9–2 to Czechs FK Teplice in the second. Santa Clara were relegated in 2003, and then spent the next 15 years in the second tier, with the lowest point being 2014–15 when the club came 19th, saving themselves from relegation with three games remaining.

In 2018, Carlos Pinto's Santa Clara team ended their exile by finishing second to C.D. Nacional, and he subsequently left. His successor João Henriques led Santa Clara to two consecutive 10th-placed finishes, their best results for position and points (43) in their history. He left in July 2020, having secured a third consecutive top-flight season for the first time in club history. Under his successor Daniel Ramos in 2020–21, the club finished a best-ever sixth to qualify for the inaugural UEFA Conference League.

Stadium
Santa Clara plays in the Estádio de São Miguel in Ponta Delgada, the largest city in the Azores.

Due to mandatory quarantine for all visitors to the Azores in the 2020 coronavirus pandemic, Santa Clara concluded the season playing home games in Oeiras near Lisbon.

Honours
 Segunda Liga
 Winners (1): 2000–01
 Portuguese Second Division
 Winners (1): 1997–98

Players

Current squad

Out on loan

International players

 Klevis Dalipi
 Figueiredo
 Kali
 Mauro
 Francisco Zuela
 José Vidigal 
 Leandro Machado
 Pedro Pacheco
 Hernâni Borges
 Mateus Lopes
 Steven Pereira 
 Stopira
 Valter Borges
 Platini
 António Duarte
 Hugo Évora
 Denis Pineda
 Malick Evouna
 Mamadu Candé
 Amido Baldé
 Édson
 István Vincze 
 Shahriyar Moghanlou
 Osama Rashid
 Idrissa Keita
 Hidemasa Morita
 Muaid Ellafi
 Mohamed Al-Gadi
 Hamdou Elhouni
 Faysal El Idrissi
 Reginaldo Faife
 Garba Lawal
 Haruna Doda 
 Abdiel Arroyo
 Alfredo Stephens
 Pauleta
 Marco Paiva
 André Pinto
 Pedro Martins
 Jorge Ribeiro 
 Ukra
 Jorge Silva
 José Leal
 António Pacheco
 Martin Chrien
 Mikel Villanueva

League and cup history

European record

References

External links
  

 
Football clubs in Portugal
Football clubs in the Azores
Association football clubs established in 1927
1927 establishments in Portugal
Sport in Ponta Delgada
Football clubs in São Miguel Island
Liga Portugal 2 clubs